Conny Perrin (born 25 December 1990) is a Swiss tennis player.

Perrin has won 13 singles titles and 23 doubles titles on the ITF Women's Circuit. On 22 October 2018, she reached her best singles ranking of world No. 134. On 21 November 2016, she peaked at No. 138 in the WTA doubles rankings.

Performance timelines

Singles

Doubles

WTA career finals

Doubles: 1 (runner–up)

ITF Circuit finals

Singles: 27 (13 titles, 14 runner–ups)

Doubles: 59 (24 titles, 35 runner–ups)

Notes

References

External links
 
 

1990 births
Living people
LGBT tennis players
Swiss LGBT sportspeople
Swiss female tennis players
Swiss-French people
Lesbian sportswomen
21st-century LGBT people